American Rover is a tall ship that operates public and private passenger harbor cruises from Norfolk, Virginia. 

Her steel hull was built in Panama City, Florida in 1985 and she was fitted out in the Willoughby area of Norfolk, Virginia. Her sail area totals 5,000 square feet, and she has twin auxiliary engines and screws.

When she entered service in 1986, she was the largest three-masted, passenger-carrying topsail schooner in the US. Her design, by Merritt Walter, is based on 19th century cargo schooners of the East coast of the United States and Chesapeake Bay.

References

External links
 American Rover website

1985 ships
Tall ships of the United States
Schooners of the United States
Ships built in Panama City, Florida
Ships built in Norfolk, Virginia